Rachael Yamagata EP, otherwise referred to as Rachael Yamagata or EP, is an extended play by American recording artist Rachael Yamagata, released by RCA Records on October 7, 2003. All songs and lyrics were written by Yamagata except "These Girls", which was co-written by Chris Holmes. The album was produced by Malcolm Burn except the song "Collide", which was produced by Doug McBride. "Collide" appears on the Bumpus album Stereoscope, and "Worn Me Down" and "The Reason Why" were re-recorded for Yamagata's debut album Happenstance.

Track listing
 "Collide"
 "Known for Years"
 "Worn Me Down" (EP Version)
 "The Reason Why" (EP Version)
 "Would You Please" (including hidden track "These Girls")

Release history

References

External links
Rachael Yamagata official website

2003 EPs
Rachael Yamagata albums